Élodie Bradford is a French television series created by Lionel Bailliu and broadcast since 20 October 2004 on the French television network M6.

Synopsis
This series depicts Élodie Bradford, a glamorous and gaffe-prone police captain.

Cast

Guest
 Philippe Lefebvre : Sébastien Auger (épisode 1)
 Anthony Delon : Antoine Morfaux (épisode 1)
 Monalisa Basarab : Olga (épisode 1)
 Frédéric Diefenthal : Julien Lemaître (épisode 2)
 Éric Savin : Ravanello (épisode 2)
 Vincent Desagnat : Fabrice Saintange (épisode 3)
 Thomas Jouannet : Sébastien Fondant (épisode 3)
 Jean-Pierre Michaël : Nicolas (épisode 4)
 Didier Bezace : Bertrand Larchet (épisode 4)
 Nicolas Gob : Éric (épisode 4)
 Raphaël Personnaz : Arnaud (épisode 4)
 Philippe Bas : Damien Moreno (épisode 5)
 Micky Sebastian : Marie-France Delort (épisode 5)
 Guillaume Delorme : Le Garrec (épisode 5)
 Zinedine Soualem : Franck Bécker (épisode 5)
 François Levantal : François Forcalquier (épisode 5)
 Thierry Godard : Jean-Louis Cazenave (épisode 5)

Recognition
 Won "Grand prix de la série" (Grand prize of the series) for the episode "Une femme à la mer" at the 2007 International Television Film Festival of Luchon.

Episodes
 Pilot
 "Les crimes étaient presque parfaits" (The crimes were almost perfect)
 "Un ami pour Élodie" (A friend for Élodie)
 "Intouchables" (Untouchables)
 "Une femme à la mer" (A woman at the sea)

References

External links

2004 French television series debuts